Cyrtodactylus tibetanus is a species of gecko that is endemic to Tibet.

References 

Cyrtodactylus
Reptiles described in 1905